Klas Albert Lindhagen (July 25, 1823 – October 21, 1887) was a Swedish city planner, lawyer, and politician.  He is mostly remembered for his city plans for Stockholm produced in the late 19th century.

Biography 

Lindhagen studied at Uppsala from 1841, received a Ph.D. in 1848, and graduated in 1849. He worked at the Svea Court of Appeal from 1854, at the Ministry for Civil Service Affairs from 1864, the Office of the Minister for Justice (Justitiestatsexpeditionen) from 1869, was member of the Legislation Committee (Lagbyrån) from 1871, and Justice of the Supreme Court 1874–1886.

He made important contributions to the health, fire safety, and construction charters of 1868 and 1874.  He was member of the board of Stockholm's folk schools (folkskola) 1862–79 and from 1863 member of the Stockholm Municipal Assembly.  As such, he had a lasting impact on the redevelopment of Stockholm's city plans and sanitary conditions, and was a leading force behind the reorganisation of the University of Stockholm.

In 1869, he was elected member of the second chamber of the Riksdag, and in 1883 member of the first chamber.

Albert Lindhagen was the father of Carl Lindhagen, Anna Lindhagen, and Arthur Lindhagen.

Notes

References 
 

1823 births
1887 deaths
Politicians from Stockholm
Justices of the Supreme Court of Sweden
History of Stockholm
Members of the Första kammaren
19th-century Swedish judges
19th-century Swedish lawyers
19th-century Swedish politicians